Be Ugly (a.k.a. "Be Marcus I" or "Be Ugly '07") was the name of a campaign that was inspired by the American television series Ugly Betty, which was announced by ABC. It was launched on December 30, 2006, and was used as the slogan for both the show and as a series of PSAs geared towards young women during the series' first season.

Background
The idea behind "Be Ugly" was to serve as a purpose to promote self-esteem among women by presenting a positive image and to end the stereotyping that is commonplace and at times criticized when it comes to body imaging and appearance. By using Betty Suarez as an example, they can show women that they can be themselves and confident without changing their looks. In fact their campaign motto is "Be real, be smart, be passionate, be true to yourself and be ugly."

In addition, the campaign had the support of Girls, Inc., a non-profit group that promotes educational programs to help young women be strong and smart. In an interview to USA Today on December 21, 2006, president Joyce Roche said the campaign "allows us to counter the messages girls get that they've got to be perfect, be a certain size, look a certain way." She adds that "We hope that people go beyond the headline of ugly." Roche also stated "I wish there would have been another way of saying it, but at least it will get the dialogue going."

Multi-Platinum Atlantic Records singer/songwriter Jason Mraz composed an original song for the campaign. "The Beauty in Ugly", was used in a variety of mediums, including TV and a music video, and was also released for download on the iTunes Store in January 2007. Part of the proceeds from the iTunes sales went to Girls, Inc.

See also
 Ugly Betty
 Dove Campaign for Real Beauty

References

External links
 "Be Ugly '07"
 "Be Ugly '07" campaign announced in USA Today (December 21, 2006)
 ABC wants you to Be Ugly in '07

Ugly Betty
Advertising campaigns
2006 neologisms
American advertising slogans